The P35 Express (codenamed Bearlake) is a mainstream desktop computer chipset from Intel released in June 2007, although motherboards featuring the chipset were available a month earlier.
The P35 Express chipset supports Intel's LGA 775 socket and Core 2 Duo and Quad processors, and is also known to support 45 nm Wolfdale/Yorkfield dual and quad core CPUs. Theoretically, Intel also dropped support for Intel's Pentium 4 and Pentium D processors with this chipset although late Pentium 4 processors, including both the 32-bit-only (5x0) and the 32-bit/64-bit (5x1), and a few others, were fully supported.

It is notable for providing the first commodity support of DDR3 SDRAM.  (It also supports DDR2 SDRAM; the choice is made by the motherboard manufacturer, and some manufacturers supported both DDR3 and DDR2 on the same motherboard, but only one memory type at a time, often 4× DDR2 or 2× DDR3, as in the Gigabyte GA-EP35C-DS3L/R; but DDR3-only models, such as the Gigabyte GA-EP35T-DS3L/R and the DDR2-only models, such as the Gigabyte GA-EP35-DS3L/R were also made, concurrently.)  Another notable point is that it does not provide Parallel ATA support; most 2007 motherboards added PATA support via a JMicron JMB361 or JMB363 chip.

Features 
 1333/1066/800 MT/s front-side bus (FSB)
 PCI Express 1.1
 Up to ×16 interface with 8 GB/s total bandwidth (4GBps down, 4GBps up).
 Some motherboards support Crossfire. No SLI support.
 Intel Fast Memory Access
 Updated Memory Controller Hub (MCH) to increase performance and reduce latency.
 Dual-channel DDR2 memory
 Up to 12.8 GB/s bandwidth and 8 GB addressable memory.
 Dual-channel DDR3 memory
 Up to 17 GB/s bandwidth and 8 GB addressable memory.
 Intel Flex Memory Technology
 Allows different memory sizes in dual-channel mode.
 Intel High Definition Audio
 Intel Matrix Storage Technology
 Supports RAID 0, 1, 5, and 10 with SATA and eSATA interfaces.
 Intel Rapid Recover Technology
 Intel Turbo Memory
 SATA 3 Gbit/s
 eSATA/Port Multiplier (Hot-plug and Port Multiplier is a BIOS option which few motherboards actually support)
 SATA Port Disable
 Allows disabling/enabling of individual SATA and eSATA ports for enhanced security.
 USB Port Disable
 Allows disabling/enabling of individual USB ports for enhanced security.
 Intel Quiet System Technology
 Automated system fan speed control.

See also 
 List of Intel chipsets

References

External links 
 P35 Express Chipset
 82P35 Memory Controller
 Intel P35 Express Chipset—Product Brief, Intel.

P35